Railway Recruitment Control Board is a government recruitment agency for Group C and Group D non-gazetted civil service and engineering posts in Indian Railways under Ministry of Railways , Government of India . It was set up in 1998 in the Ministry of Railways (Railway Board), New Delhi.

Objectives
 Formulation of policy in regard to recruitment procedures.
 To monitor the activities of all Railway Recruitment Boards (RRBs) including expenditure incurred for recruitment.
 To evaluate the performance of RRB's and advise them on priorities as required.
 To organise a management information system for monitoring work done by RRB's.

Railway Recruitment Boards

Overview
Railway Recruitment Boards are organisations under the Government of India that manage the appointment of new employees to work in Indian Railways. There are 21 offices of railway recruiting board all over the India: 

Ahemadabad
Ajmer
Allahabad
Bangalore
Bhopal
Bhubaneswar
Bilaspur
Chandigarh
Chennai
Gorakhpur
Guwahati
Jammu and Kashmir
Kolkata
Malda
Mumbai
Muzaffarpur
Patna
Ranchi
Secunderabad
Siliguri 
Thiruvananthapuram

History
In 1942, a Service Commission with a chairman and two members was established for recruitment of Subordinate Staff on the then North Western Railway was known as Railway Service Commission.

Developments
In 1945, the Services Commissions were set up at Bombay, Calcutta, Madras and Lucknow. In 1948, the Indian Railway Enquiry Committee reviewed working of commissions. In 1949, due to financial constraints a ban was imposed on recruitments on Indian Railways thus numbers of commissions was reduced to one centrally located at Bombay. In 1953-54 when Economic conditions of Indian Railway improved, four service commission were again set up at Bombay, Madras, Allahabad and Calcutta. In 1956, the Estimates committee generally approved the method of recruitment by the constitution of the Railway Service Commissions. In 1983, to cater to the needs of areas which were being neglected due to locations of the existing commissions, seven more commissions were set up viz, at Ahmedabad, Ajmer, Bhopal, Bhuvneshwar, Chandigarh, Jammu and Srinagar with sitting at Leh and Trivendrum. In 1984 two more service commissions were set up at Malda and Gorakhpur. In January, 1985 Railway Service Commissions have been renamed as Railway Recruitment Board (RRB). At present 21 Railway Recruitment Boards are functioning.

ALP & Technician
Railway Recruitment Board (RRB) conducts computer based examination for recruitment of ALP & Technician posts. RRB has released centralized notification 01/2018 for total 26502 vacancies. RRB ALP & Technician Recruitment 2018 will be held in two stages followed by Aptitude Test (if applicable) and Document Verification. First Stage CBT was scheduled in the month of May and June 2018. The second CBT was held in January 2019 and psychology test was held on 10 June. The document verification started from July in various zones and still going on. The final empanelling is supposed to be completed in December 2019.

RRB NTPC
Railway Recruitment Board (RRB) conducts Non-Technical Popular Categories (NTPC) exam to recruit Commercial apprentice, Goods guard, Traffic Apprentice, Traffic Assistant, Assistant Station Master, etc. all over India.

RRB JE
Railway Recruitment Board (RRB) conducts RRB JE exam to recruit Junior Engineer (JE), Junior Engineer (Information Technology), Depot Material Superintendent (DMS) and Chemical & Metallurgical Assistant (CMA) for Indian Railway all over India.

See also

 List of Public service commissions in India

References

External links
 

Government agencies established in 1998
1998 establishments in Delhi
Ministry of Railways (India)
Government recruitment in India